Serge Panine is an 1880 novel by the French writer Georges Ohnet.

Adaptations
It has been adapted into films on four occasions:
 Serge Panine (1913 film), a French silent film
 Serge Panine (1915 film), an American silent film
A Life for a Life (1916), a Russian film
 Serge Panine (1922 film), an Austrian-French silent film
 Serge Panine (1939 film), a French film

References

1890 French novels
Novels by Georges Ohnet
French novels adapted into films